Cochylis faustana is a moth of the family Tortricidae. It is found in China (Inner Mongolia, Xinjiang) and Russia.

The wingspan is 8-9.5 mm.

References

Moths described in 1919
Cochylis